Jovan Jovanović may refer to:

Jovan Jovanović Zmaj (1833—1904), Serbian poet, writer, songwriter, and physician
Jovan Jovanović (bishop) (1732—1805), Serbian Orthodox Bishop of Bačka
Jeronim Jovanović, monastic name Jovan (1825 — 1894), Serbian Orthodox Bishop
Jovan P. Jovanović (1862—1926), Serbian engineer
Jovan Jovanović Pižon (1869—1939), Serbian politician and diplomat
Jovan Jovanović (historian) (1875-1931), Serbian historian
Jovan Jovanović (lawyer) (1905—1992), Serbian lawyer
Jovan Jovanović (film director) (1940), Serbian film director
Jovan B. Jovanović (1961), Serbian musician
Jovan Jovanović (chemist), President of the Serbian Chemistry Association 1993-1997
Jovan Jovanović (politician) (b. 1970), member of the National Assembly of Serbia
Jovan Jovanović (footballer) (b. 1985), Serbian footballer
Jovan Jovanović (rower) (b. 1991), Serbian rower
 Jovan Jovanović (doctor) (1845-1909), Serbian doctor who bequeathed all his property to the Serbian Academy of Sciences and Arts